The National Socialist Association of Legal Professionals (German: Nationalsozialistischer Rechtswahrerbund, or NSRB) was the professional organization  of German legal professionals (lawyers, judges, public prosecutors, notaries and legal academics) in the Third Reich from 1936 to 1945. 
It  was the successor of the Association of National Socialist German Legal Professionals  (German: Bund Nationalsozialistischer Deutscher Juristen, or BNSDJ), which existed from 1928 to 1936.

References

Bibliography
 

 

1928 establishments in Germany
1945 disestablishments in Germany
Law-related professional associations
Legal organisations based in Germany
Law in Nazi Germany
Nazi Party organizations
Organizations established in 1928
Professional associations based in Germany